St. Joseph's College, Wattala also known as "St. Joseph's College Colombo 10 - Wattala Branch" was formerly known as St. Joseph's College, Enderamulla. It is a Catholic private school situated in the suburbs of Colombo. It is a selective entry Catholic school commenced on 10 January 1996 under the guidance of Rev. Dr. Stanley Abeysekera. The College enrolls over 1,400 students with a staff of over 85.

The school is a non-fee levying school, whereby it receives some state funding, relying mostly on funds from an extensive network of alumni worldwide.

School buildings cover  and include a College chapel, and auditorium.

History 
The concept of the branch schools in the Archdiocese was initiated by the Oswald Gomis, the Archbishop of Colombo. St. Joseph’s College, Wattala, was in fact the first branch school of St. Joseph's College, Colombo.

The school commenced with sixty students on 10 January 1996 under the guidance of the first Rector, Stanley Abeysekera. Thereafter, a few buildings including an auditorium were constructed as the requirement arose.

The school was constructed on a plot of land of  donated by Esther Seneviratne on 17 January 1991, a member of the Catholic Parish of Enderamulla. She donated this land in memory of her husband Wilfred Seneviratne. On 28 August 1992, the President, Ranasinghe Premadasa, donated a  land to Nicholas Marcus Fernando. It was during this time that the Gomis and Fernando drew up a plan to put up the second branch school of the Archdiocese of Colombo within the aforementioned properties and in the vicinity of Enderamulla.

At first, in a temporary building, a nursery for the children of Enderamulla, Mabole, Wattala and Kelaniya was opened in 1995 by the Directress of the Nursery Section, Lourdes Marie. The first teacher in this nursery was Mariya Sarojini Coin. While the nursery was functioning, the construction work for the new school was begun with the financial support of the Catholic Businessmen and Professionals Association, affiliated to the Archdiocese.

The president of the Association was Joel Selvanayagam, who with the other members initiated this project to construct a branch school of St. Joseph's College. In a year's time, the first two-storey building with six classrooms was ready to start the school.

On 10 January 1996, the first academic year was started with 60 students from neighbouring areas including Wattala, Mabole, Ragama, Kelaniya and Weliveriya.

Past Priests-in-Charge, Principals and Rectors

Priests-in-Charge

Principals

Rectors

College Identity

Colour(s) 
Blue & White

Flag 

The official college flag consists of two navy blue stripes and a white stripe in the middle which are all equal in size. In some occasions, a flag with the college Crest placed in the middle is also used.

Houses

Bonjean House 
 Named after Ernest Christopher Bonjean, first Archbishop of Colombo.
 Colour :

Melizan House 
 Named after Andrew Melizan, second Archbishop of Colombo. 
 Colour :

Coudert House 
 Named after Anthony Coudert, third Archbishop of Colombo.
 Colour :

Marque House 
 Named after Peter Marque, fourth Archbishop of Colombo.
 Colour :

References

External links
Official website

Private schools in Sri Lanka
Catholic schools in Sri Lanka
Catholic secondary schools in Sri Lanka
Schools in Gampaha District